Executive Order 11490, an executive order of October 28, 1969, calls for federal agencies to prepare plans for a state of emergency that would require "over-all civilian manpower mobilization programs" and related emergency measures. The order was conceived and signed by President Richard Nixon.

Economist Howard Ruff said of the order that it gave the president sweeping authority, unbalancing the separation of powers in government, set in motion merely by the president claiming a national emergency. He said, "The only thing standing between us and a dictatorship is the good character of the president and the lack of a crisis severe enough that the public would stand still for it."

In 2012 the order was consolidated into Executive Order 13603.

References

Executive Order 11490 - Assigning emergency preparedness functions to Federal departments and agencies

11490